Althea Gibson and Darlene Hard were the defending champions, but Hard did not compete. Gibson partnered with Maria Bueno, and they defeated Margaret duPont and Margaret Varner in the final, 6–3, 7–5 to win the ladies' doubles tennis title at the 1958 Wimbledon Championships.

Seeds

  Maria Bueno /  Althea Gibson (champions)
  Shirley Bloomer /  Christine Truman (third round)
  Mary Hawton /  Thelma Long (semifinals)
  Yola Ramírez /  Rosie Reyes (semifinals)

Draw

Finals

Top half

Section 1

Section 2

Bottom half

Section 3

Section 4

References

External links

Women's Doubles
Wimbledon Championship by year – Women's doubles
Wimbledon Championships
Wimbledon Championships